FK506-binding protein 3 also known as FKBP25 is a protein that in humans is encoded by the FKBP3 gene.

Function 

The protein encoded by this gene is a member of the immunophilin protein family, which play a role in immunoregulation and basic cellular processes involving protein folding and trafficking. This encoded protein is a cis-trans prolyl isomerase that binds the immunosuppressants FK506 and rapamycin. It has a higher affinity for rapamycin than for FK506 and thus may be an important target molecule for immunosuppression by rapamycin.

Interactions 

FKBP3 has been shown to interact with YY1, HDAC1, Histone deacetylase 2, DNA, and Mdm2. Both crystal structure of FKBP25 with FK506 and the NMR structure of full length FKBP25 has been published with PDB ID 5D75 and 2MPH respectively.

References

Further reading

External links 
 PDBe-KB provides an overview of all the structure information available in the PDB for Human Peptidyl-prolyl cis-trans isomerase FKBP3 
 PDBe-KB provides an overview of all the structure information available in the PDB for Mouse Peptidyl-prolyl cis-trans isomerase FKBP3

EC 5.2.1